Henry IV of Bar (abt 1315–1344) was count of Bar from 1336 to 1344. His aunt, Joan of Bar, Countess of Surrey, governed Bar in his name during his minority.  He was the son of Edward I of Bar and his wife Marie of Burgundy. He married Yolande of Dampierre (died 1395), a granddaughter of Robert III, Count of Flanders.

Henry and Yolande had two sons:
Edward II of Bar, became count on the death of his father
Robert I of Bar, became count on the death of his brother

Notes

References

Sources
 Georges Poull, La Maison souveraine et ducale de Bar, 1994

1315 births
1344 deaths
Counts of Bar